is a train station in the city of Kurashiki, Okayama Prefecture, Japan. It is the southern terminus of the Mizushima Main Line, operated by the Mizushima Rinkai Railway. Currently, only a few services during rush hour stop at this station.

Lines
 Mizushima Rinkai Railway
 Mizushima Main Line

Adjacent stations

|-
!colspan=5|Mizushima Rinkai Railway

References

Mizushima Rinkai Railway Mizushima Main Line
Railway stations in Okayama Prefecture
Railway stations in Japan opened in 1972
Kurashiki